Kvitsøy Lighthouse is a coastal lighthouse and heritage building in the municipality of Kvitsøy in Rogaland county, Norway.  It is located on the west side of the village of Ydstebøhamn on the island of Kvitsøy.  The lighthouse marks the entrance to the huge Boknafjorden, the main shipping route to the city of Stavanger, and inland Rogaland county.  The first lighthouse at the site was established in 1700, and the present lighthouse was built in 1829. The lighthouse was automated in 1969, and has been a protected historic building since 1998.

The 1829 tower
There is a 2nd order Fresnel lens at the top of the tower. The building is painted white, with the lantern on the top painted red. The light emits four white flashes every 40 seconds.

The lighthouse was automated and depopulated in 1969, and has been preserved as a protected historic building. Kvitsøy Lighthouse is the oldest stone tower lighthouse still in operation in Norway.

The 1700 light
The first construction from 1700 was a pivotal "bucket light" fuelled by coal, which could be lifted about six metres above the ground. The lamp was lit from 20 August to 20 March during the night. The operation of the light was funded by a toll system for ships passing Kvitsøy. A replica model of the bucket light from 1700 was installed in 2005 near the current lighthouse.

See also

Lighthouses in Norway
List of lighthouses in Norway

References

External links

 Norsk Fyrhistorisk Forening 

Lighthouses completed in 1700
Towers completed in 1700
Lighthouses in Rogaland
Kvitsøy
Listed lighthouses in Norway
1700 establishments in Norway